Dzoncauich Municipality (In the Yucatec Maya Language: “Cauich's rifle”) is one of the 106 municipalities in the Mexican state of Yucatán containing  (355.12 km2) of land and located roughly 85 km northeast of the city of Mérida.

History
During pre-Hispanic times, the area was part of the chieftainship of Ah Kinchel. After the conquest the area became part of the encomienda system and as early as 1549 the encomendero was Alonso Julián. Later, the encomienda was shared by Francisco Dorado and Ignacio Barbosa Briceño in 1689.

Yucatán declared its independence from the Spanish Crown in 1821 and in 1825, the area was assigned to the coastal region with its headquarters in Izamal. In 1905, it was a part of the Temax Municipality but became head of its own municipality in 1928.

Governance
The municipal president is elected for a three year term. The town council has eight aldermen and two trustees, who serve as Secretary of the Town Hall; Treaturer; legal coordinator; education coordinator; sports coordinator; tourism coordinator; coordinator of social communication; coordinator of dissemination, civic promotion and recreation; director of public works; director of urban planning; coordinator of the House of Culture; director of security, roads and transportation; and director of health issues and social welfare.

The Municipal Council administers the business of the municipality. It is responsible for budgeting and expenditures and producing all required reports for all branches of the municipal administration. Annually it determines educational standards for schools.

The Police Commissioners ensure public order and safety. They are tasked with enforcing regulations, distributing materials and administering rulings of general compliance issued by the council.

Communities
The head of the municipality is Dzoncauich, Yucatán. The other populated areas in the municipality are Chacmay and the Haciendas of: Mario, San Matias and San Pedro. The significant populations are shown below:

Local festivals
Every year on 8 August a celebration is held in honor of the patron saint of the town, San Juan Bautista.

Tourist attractions
 Church of St. John the Baptist, built in the seventeenth century

References

Municipalities of Yucatán